Scott Erik Jaffe (born April 29, 1969) is an American former competition swimmer and Olympic medalist.  Jaffe represented the United States at the 1992 Summer Olympics in Barcelona, Spain.  He earned a bronze medal by swimming for the third-place U.S. team in the preliminary heats of the men's 4×200-meter freestyle relay.

Jaffe studied at the University of California, Berkeley, where he swam for the California Golden Bears swimming and diving team.

See also
 List of Olympic medalists in swimming (men)
 List of University of California, Berkeley alumni

References

External links
 Scott Jaffe – Olympic athlete profile at Sports-Reference.com

1969 births
Living people
American male freestyle swimmers
California Golden Bears men's swimmers
Olympic bronze medalists for the United States in swimming
Sportspeople from Boston
Swimmers at the 1992 Summer Olympics
Medalists at the 1992 Summer Olympics
20th-century American people
21st-century American people